The War of the Cities was five series of air raids, missile attacks and artillery shellings on major cities and urban areas initiated by Saddam Hussein's Iraqi Air Force, with the aim of disrupting the morale of Iran during the Iran–Iraq War. The first phase of air strikes were undertaken by the Iraqi Air Force, which normally was followed by retaliation by the Iranian Armed Forces.

Iraq attacked major cities in the western half of Iran, including Tehran, Tabriz, Isfahan and Shiraz, in addition to attacks to Iranian towns and cities close to the front. Iran's retaliations targeted mostly Baghdad, Kirkuk and Basra.

Raids
While Iraq had launched numerous attacks with aircraft and missiles against border cities from the beginning of the war and sporadic raids on Iran's main cities, this was the first systematic strategic bombing that Iraq carried out during the war. This would become known as the "War of the Cities". With the help of the US and the West, Iraq's air force had been rebuilt and expanded. Meanwhile, Iran, due to sanctions and lack of spare parts, had heavily curtailed its air force operations.

After the fall of 1981, in the context of the Iranian ground counter-offensives, the USSR lifted their arms embargo and massively rearmed Iraq, including with 40 MiG-25s, which enabled the Iraqi air force to challenge Iran's F-14s in their air space.
Iraq used Tu-22 Blinder and Tu-16 Badger strategic bombers to carry out long-range high-speed raids on Iranian cities, including Tehran. Fighter-bombers such as the MiG-25 Foxbat and Su-22 Fitter were used against smaller or shorter range targets, as well as escorting the strategic bombers. Civilian and industrial targets were hit by the raids, and each successful raid inflicted economic damage from regular strategic bombing.

In response, the Iranians deployed F-4 Phantoms to combat the Iraqis, and eventually they deployed F-14s as well.  By 1986, Iran also expanded its air defense network to take the load of the fighting off the air force. Later in the war, Iraqi raids primarily consisted of missile attacks while air attacks were used on fewer, more important targets. Starting in 1987, Saddam Hussein also ordered several chemical attacks on civilian targets in Iran, such as the town of Sardasht.

Iran also launched several retaliatory air raids on Iraq, while primarily shelling border cities such as Basra. Iran also bought some Scud missiles from Libya and launched them against Baghdad. These too inflicted damage upon Iraq.

On 7 February 1984 (during the First War of the Cities), Saddam ordered his air force to attack eleven Iranian cities; bombardments ceased on 22 February 1984. Though Saddam had aimed for the attacks to demoralize Iran and force them to negotiate, they had little effect. Iraq's air force took heavy losses, and Iran struck back, hitting Baghdad and other Iraqi cities. Nevertheless, the attacks resulted in tens of thousands of civilian casualties on both sides, and became known as the first "war of the cities". It was estimated that 4,700 Iranian civilians were killed and 22,000 were wounded during the raids in February alone. There were five such major exchanges throughout the course of the war, and multiple minor ones. While interior cities such as Tehran, Tabriz, Qom, Isfahan and Shiraz did receive numerous raids, it was the cities of western Iran that suffered the most death and destruction.

Series
Five series of systematic air raids were conducted over eight years.

The first series, initiated by the Iraqi Army, lasted from February 7 to 22, 1984, and was conducted in response to the Iranian refusal to observe a ceasefire.

The second series was conducted from March 22 to April 8, 1985 and was in response to Iranian Operation Badr. This series involved attacking many Iranian urban areas in western Iran, including Tehran, Tabriz, Shiraz, and Isfahan.

The third series was lasted from January 17 to 25, 1987, and was conducted in response to Iranian Operation Dawn 8.

The fourth series was conducted for three consecutive months from February to April 1987.

The fifth series was the most intensive, and was conducted by Iraq once the Iranian front lines showed elements of weakening. It was conducted in January-February 1988, and involved missile attacks to some Iranian cities.

Aftermath
The conflict caused initiation of Iran's missile program by IRGC.

In popular culture
The war era has become the theme of many films, with some of them representing the situation of cities in the wartime. For example,  (1992) portrays the general image of Tehran as a quiet city that turned to a location of a rocket war and sometimes this calmness and quietness breaks with the sound of ambulances and fire-fighting alarms. Under the Shadow (2016) is another film, which portrays Tehran during the war of the cities.

References

Sources

 
 
 

Battles involving Iran
Iran–Iraq War
Airstrikes in Iraq
Airstrikes conducted by Iran
Airstrikes during the Iran–Iraq War
Strategic bombing operations and battles